The Smolensk Aviation Plant (SmAZ) is a Russian aircraft production and servicing company. Founded in 1926, since 1993 it has been a Joint stock company.

History
The facility was founded in 1926 as "Aviation Repair Plant No.3", in 1928 it was redesignated "Plant No.35". Between 1941 and 1944 it was relocated to Kuybyshev as part of "Plant #1". Until 1966, it was known as "Plant #475" of the NKAP (Narodny Kommissariat Aviatsionnoy Promyshlennosti, People's Commissariat for Aviation Industry). It was renamed again in 1967 as the "Smolensk Machine Building Plant" of MAP (Ministerstvo Aviatsionnoy Promyshlennosti, Ministry for the Aviation Industry). It received its present name in 1974.

During the 1960s and 1970s SmAZ primarily produced aircraft and aircraft parts designed by the Yakovlev Design Bureau. During the 1980s production at Smolensk included the Myasishchev-designed high-altitude M-55 Geofizika aircraft, cruise missiles like the Kh-55 Granat and parts for the Buran space shuttle. In addition, SmAZ produces medical and light industry equipment. On July 1, 1993 it was privatized, and has since operated as a joint stock company.

List of production/serviced aircraft
Grigorovich I-2 (full name was I-7(I-2)) I-2 page
Polikarpov R-1, I-3, R-5, Po-2, I-15, I-16
Tupolev TB-1/ANT-4, R-6/ANT-7, SB/ANT-40
Bureau of Special Developments (БОК) of Chizhevski BOK-1 (stratospheric), BOK-5 (flying wing), BOK-7 (high altitude), BOK-15 (record setting)
Ilyushin Il-2
Lavochkin La-5, La-7
 cruise missiles like Kh-55
Yakovlev Yak-3, Yak-7, Yak-9, Yak-11, Yak-18T, Yak-42, Yak-112
Bakshaev A-2, VA-3/48, PM gliders
Myasishchev M-55
Technoavia SM92 Finist, SM-94-1, SM-2000, SP-55M
Sukhoi Su-38

References

External links
Official website
Federation of American Scientists

Tactical Missiles Corporation
Aircraft manufacturers of the Soviet Union
Manufacturing companies established in 1926
Aerospace companies of Russia
Aircraft manufacturers of Russia
Russian brands
Companies based in Smolensk Oblast